In Gaelic mythology, Brian (or Uar) was one of the three Sons of Tuireann along with Iuchar and Iucharba.

Name 
In many extant institutionally-held manuscripts of the Oidheadh Chlainne Tuireann, Brian is actually called Uar (or Uair), but the name has been emended by editors to "Brian" which conforms with the name in ancient texts. Eugene O'Curry was working from a manuscript in his possession, and gives the name as "Brian", but notes that "Uar" was an alternate name for Brian.

Plot 
In Oidheadh Chlainne Tuireann (The Tragedy of the Sons of Tuireann), the three set out to kill their father's enemy Cian. Cian is the father of Lugh, one of the greatest of the Tuatha Dé Danann. Cian shapeshifts into a pig to disguise himself, but the brothers shapeshift into dogs and hound him. They kill him, dismember his body and try to cover up their crime. In recompense, Lugh makes them quest all around the known world fetching magical weapons, which Lugh plans to use at the Second Battle of Magh Tuireadh. They succeed in obtaining all that Lugh demanded, but return to Ireland badly wounded, pleading for Lugh to heal them; but he refuses.

In at least one version of this tale, Brian is the clever and subtle one, while his brothers Iuchar and Iucharba are bumbling and easily overawed by Brian. This tale of the Sons of Tuireann has sometimes been likened to an Irish Argonautica.

Popular culture

Brian is one of the main characters in As Baile: A Story, a 2012 novel retelling the tale of the Sons of Tuireann.

Brian is the name given to a minor enemy NPC in Fire Emblem: Genealogy Of The Holy War, who appears alongside two other characters called Iuchar and Iucharba, referencing the tale.

See also 
 Brian - In later Scottish folklore, a pompous man who helped the Cailleach rescue Deò-ghrèine.

Explanatory notes

References 
Citations=

Bibliography

 
 
  (Some of the earlier notes on MSS in the earlier edition are wanting)

Irish gods
Tuatha Dé Danann
Scottish mythology